Loreta Graužinienė (born 10 January 1963) is a Lithuanian politician, former Speaker of the Seimas and former leader of the Lithuanian Labour party.

Life

Graužinienė was born in Rokiškis in northeastern Lithuania. She studied at Rokiškio Juozas Tumas-Vaižgantas gymnasium. She is married and has two children. Graužinienė has been the member of the Lithuanian parliament, the Seimas since 2004. She is the former leader of the Lithuanian Labour Party and was the speaker of the Seimas between October 2013 and November 2016. She unsuccessfully ran in the 2009 Lithuanian presidential election.

In the Seimas, she has served the Audit Committee, European Affairs Committee, the Labour and Social Affairs Committee and the Budget and Finance Committee.

References

1963 births
Living people
Women Speakers of the Seimas
Labour Party (Lithuania) politicians
People from Rokiškis
21st-century Lithuanian politicians
21st-century Lithuanian women politicians